Unearthed and Understood is a documentary produced by the President's Commission on Slavery and the University at the University of Virginia. The film, produced and directed by Eduardo Montes-Bradley for Heritage Film Project, premiered at the "Universities Confronting the Legacy of Slavery" symposium in Charlottesville on October 16, 2014.

Argument
In a series of interviews with members of the President's Commission on Slavery and the University, the film expresses current state of affairs, concerns and hopes for the work ahead as the University of Virginia investigates its painful past of slavery and slave trade.
The President's Commission on Slavery and the University objective is to provide recommendations on the commemoration of the University of Virginia's historical relationship to slavery. It was established in September 2013. Unearthed and Understood is its first documentary presentation.

Billing Block

References

External links
 Official UVA YouTube Site 
 Universities Confronting the Legacy of Slavery 
 McCarthy, Ginger. "Slavery at the University of Virginia: Reception, film and panel discussion." Examiner OnLine 
 Panel Discusses History of Slavery at UVA. NBC Channel 29 
 Bromley, Anne. "From Kitchens to Gravesites: Commission Explores History of Slavery at U.Va." UVA Today. Charlottesville, September 11, 2014 

2014 documentary films
American documentary films
University of Virginia
Documentary films about slavery in the United States
History of slavery in Virginia
Films directed by Eduardo Montes-Bradley
2010s English-language films
2010s American films